Jean Barbier (9 July 1875 – 31 October 1931) was a French-Basque author.

Life

He participated in the creation and discussion of the Euskaltzaindia, the Academy of the Basque language.

Works

He contributed regularly to the weekly Navarro-labourdin Eskualduna. He reviewed for Gure Herria from the time of its founding in 1921.  His first publications were translations of religious works: Ama Birjina Lurden: les merveilles de Massabielle [Friend Bikina Lurden: the Virgin Mary of Lourdes] (1920) was based on a French work by the Abbé Prévost.

In 1926, he published a novel, Piarres, with a preface Oxobi (Jules Moulier), which was pre-published in Gure Herria. Printed to 400 copies, it quickly sold out. The second part of Piarres was published in 1930. The novel has been called "perhaps the most valuable creative description of Basque life at the turn of the [20th] century that we have".

Bibliography

 Supazter Chokoan, 1925, A. Foltzer
 Ichtorio-Michterio, 1929, Bayonne
 Piarres, 2 vol. (1926-1930)
 Antxitxarburu-ko buhamiak (1971, Ikas)
 Ixtorio-mixtorio ipuin-mipuinak (1990, Labayru)
 Sorgiñak. Bi zatikiko Antzerkia (1931, Leizaola)

References

External links
 
 literaturaren zubitegia: Jean Barbier

1875 births
1931 deaths
20th-century French Roman Catholic priests
Basque-language writers
French folklorists
20th-century French novelists
Roman Catholic writers
20th-century French male writers
20th-century French translators
French male novelists
French male non-fiction writers
Basque Roman Catholic priests